Sudha Sundararaman (born 1958) is an Indian politician and the central committee member of Communist Party of India (Marxist). As of 2014, she is the general secretary of All India Democratic Women's Association.

Biography
Sundararaman became interested in the Students' Federation of India, a student wing of Communist Party of India (Marxist), while she was a student of English literature at Ethiraj College for Women, Chennai. After her graduation, she completed a Master of Philosophy and started her career as a school teacher. Sundararaman married one of her friends. During this time, she involved herself in activities such as saving women victims from violence against them. Following that, she quit her teaching job and joined All India Democratic Women's Association (AIDWA), the women's wing of the Communist Party of India (Marxist). In 1995, Sundararaman was appointed the general secretary of AIDWA Tamil Nadu and continued to hold the position till 2001.

Sundararaman challenged the opposition to passing the Women's Reservation Bill which proposes to amend the Constitution of India to reserve 1/3 of all seats in the lower house of Parliament of India and in all state legislative assemblies for women.

References

External links

Communist Party of India (Marxist) politicians from Tamil Nadu
1958 births
Living people
Indian women activists
Politicians from Chennai
Women in Tamil Nadu politics
Indian women's rights activists
20th-century Indian politicians
20th-century Indian women politicians
Activists from Tamil Nadu
21st-century Indian women politicians
21st-century Indian politicians